Kevin Yeap Soon Choy (born 4 August 1989) is a Malaysian swimmer. In the 2010 Commonwealth Games he swam the 1500m freestyle, the 200m freestyle, the 4x100m and the 4x200m relays and the 400m freestyle. He was the gold medalist for Perak in Melaka in 2010. Yeap won a SEA Games gold medal in the 10k open water swimming in Kuala Lumpur in 2017. He announced his retirement after this win.

He is currently the coach of the Perak swimming team.

References 

1989 births
Living people
Malaysian male swimmers
Place of birth missing (living people)
Swimmers at the 2010 Commonwealth Games
Competitors at the 2017 Southeast Asian Games
Southeast Asian Games gold medalists for Malaysia
Southeast Asian Games medalists in swimming
Commonwealth Games competitors for Malaysia
21st-century Malaysian people
Swimmers at the 2010 Asian Games
Swimmers at the 2014 Asian Games